WFET-LD (channel 15) is a low-power television station licensed to Lewisburg, Tennessee, United States, and also serving Columbia. Owned by Gray Television, it is a translator of Nashville-based Telemundo affiliate WTNX-LD (channel 15), and also functions as a repeater for its full-power sister station, NBC affiliate WSMV-TV (channel 4). WFET-LD's transmitter is located along West 6th Street and Reservoir Hill Road in downtown Columbia; its parent stations share studios on Knob Road in West Nashville.

History

As a hybrid independent/religious network station
The station signed on the air at some time in 2005 as W34DB. It served the Lewisburg area as an independent station, and was sister to former country radio stations WAXO-AM-FM (now WJJM-AM-FM). W34DB also served as a secondary affiliate of America One in the mid-morning hours (until that network was discontinued in September 2014 and merged with Youtoo TV), and as a secondary Gospel Broadcasting Network (GBN) affiliate until 2015. Local programming and replays of local high school sporting events were also seen on the station; at other times, the station aired a community bulletin board with audio from WAXO playing in the background. The station was also streamed online via WAXO's website, until it was removed sometime in 2013.

In 2012, W34DB was shut down and replaced with W29DM-D. This was done in a form of a flash-cut transition from analog UHF channel 34 to digital UHF channel 29.

An application was filed on November 2, 2018, to return the station to the air. The station would be sold to the new owner, Maurice Bailey, the next year on July 8, 2019, and at the same time, the callsign changed to the current WFET-LD.

On November 29, 2019, WFET-LD returned to the air carrying three subchannels, with localized classic TV shows airing on 29.1, classic movies on 29.2, and Reel Country Music on 29.3, which features country music videos. WFET also streamed all three of its digital subchannels online, until they were taken down after the sale of the station in 2022.

Sale to Gray Television; relaunch as Telemundo
On January 8, 2022, the Bailey family signed a deal to sell WFET-LD to Atlanta-based Gray Television (owner of WSMV-TV) for $125,000. The sale of the station was finalized on February 22, 2022. Gray did not reveal future plans of WFET-LD before the sale of the station was finalized.

WFET-LD would return to the air on September 13, 2022, as a repeater of Telemundo affiliate WTNX-LD. It also relays WSMV-TV on a separate subchannel, as it is mapped as virtual channel 4.10.

Subchannels
The station's digital signal is multiplexed:

References

FET-LD
Telemundo network affiliates
Spanish-language television stations in Tennessee
Low-power television stations in the United States
Television channels and stations established in 2012
2012 establishments in Tennessee
Marshall County, Tennessee
Gray Television